The Franciscan Servants of Jesus was a Catholic, Franciscan religious community for women. The congregation was founded in 1997 with the approval of Raymond Burke while he was the Bishop of La Crosse. The motherhouse was located in Prescott, Wisconsin.

Controversy arose concerning the foundress of the congregation, Sister Julie Green, F.S.J., due to her being a transgender woman. Burke claimed that the matter had been approved by the Holy See. 

The congregation was suppressed by Burke in 2003, before his departure to head the Archdiocese of St. Louis, and is no longer in existence.

References

Catholic Church in Wisconsin
Catholic female orders and societies
Congregations of Franciscan sisters
Pierce County, Wisconsin
Christian organizations established in 1997
2003 disestablishments in Wisconsin
Catholic religious institutes established in the 20th century
1997 establishments in Wisconsin